Rietvallei Wine Estate is a wine estate in the Robertson Valley, Western Cape, South Africa.

Origins
Acquired in 1864 for his son Jacobus Francois, Alwyn Burger established Rietvallei Wine Estate. The wine estate has been in the same family for 6 generations and is still personally managed by the Burgers. It is one of the oldest wine farms in the Robertson area and is situated in the Klaas Voogds Valley.

Estate
The estate comprises 250 hectares in total with 99 hectares under vineyard. The estate is still planted with predominantly white noble cultivars covering 63 percent (%), with red noble cultivars only 33%. The soil types vary from red calcareous clay-loam, to deep calcareous loam, and some sandy alluvial soil. Rietvallei soils have the capacity to promote concentrated sweetness in the grapes and this enhances the flavour and aroma of the fruit.

Muscadel 1908
Rietvallei Estate was one of the first wine estates in South Africa to plant the Red Muscadel variety of grape, one of its vineyards being over 100 years old, planted in 1908, which is the oldest of its kind in South Africa. A unique single vineyard fortified wine called Rietvallei 1908 Muscadel is made from this specific vineyard. Older vintages of this wine have been on auction at the Nederburg Auction.

The Wines
Wines produced at Rietvallei include Sauvignon Blanc, Chardonnay, Chenin Blanc, various red and white blends, Cabernet Sauvignon, Cabernet Franc, Petit Verdot, Cinsaut and a 1908 Red Muscadel. 
They also produce a number of wines under different labels, such as Rietvallei Estate, Burger Family Wines, John B and Stonedale.

References

Wineries of South Africa
Economy of the Western Cape